Rishya Singar is a 1964 Indian Tamil language film directed by Mukkamala. The film stars K. Balaji and Rajasulochana.

Plot 

The story is based on the life of an Indian seer Rishyasringa

Cast 
The following list is adapted from the book Thiraikalanjiyam Part 2.

Male cast
K. Balaji
Gummadi
Pattu Iyer
L. Narayana Rao
Nagayya
T. V. Sethuraman
V. K. Srinivasan
Serukalathur Sama
P. S. Venkatachalam
Babji

Female cast
Rajasulochana
Girija
K. Malathi
Sukumari
Latha
K. S. Angamuthu
Kusalakumari
Lalitha Rao

Production 
The film was first produced in Telugu with the title Rushyasrunga and was released in 1961. The film was produced by P. S. Seshachalam under the banner Ravanam Brothers and was directed by Mukkamala. The story was re made in Tamil by Geetha Pictures with a different cast and was released in 1964. Mukkamala directed the Tamil film also. Thanjai N. Ramaiah Dass and M. S. Subramaniam wrote the dialogues. Adhi A. Irani and Malli M. Irani were in charge of cinematography while the editing was done by A. Sanjeevi. Art direction was done by T. V. S. Sharma and M. Somanath. Choreography by Pasumarthi Krishnamoorthi. Still photography by R. N. Nagaraja Rao. The film was shot at Vijaya, Vauhini and Neptune studios and was processed at Vijaya laboratory.

Soundtrack 
The music was composed by T. V. Raju and the lyrics were penned by Papanasam Sivan, Thanjai N. Ramaiah Dass and M. S. Subramaniam.

References

External links 

1960s Tamil-language films